María Teresa Chávez Ledesma (born 19 February 1953) is a Honduran politician. She currently serves as deputy of the National Congress of Honduras representing the National Party of Honduras for El Paraíso.

References

1953 births
Living people
Deputies of the National Congress of Honduras
National Party of Honduras politicians
21st-century Honduran women politicians
21st-century Honduran politicians
People from El Paraíso Department